Abrakebabra  is an Irish fast-food restaurant chain established in Dublin, Ireland in 1982.
 
When the first Abrakebabra restaurant was opened in Rathmines in Dublin it attracted huge attention catering to late-night crowds with a fresh menu that included introducing the doner kebab to the Irish market.
 
As of 2020, there are 33 Abrekabra restaurants in total, including 11 in Dublin, 5 in Cork, 1 in Northern Ireland (on the A26 south of Ballymena).

Cards
The Abrakebabra Gold Card (AKA Doner Card) allows the recipient free food for life. It is sent unexpectedly, when a public figure expresses their interest/relationship with the brand. Singer Cheryl Cole received a gold card after telling a radio station that Abrakebabra's kebabs were the best. Actor Colin Farrell stated in an interview that he and Irish musician Bono also have gold cards.
 
Actor Colin Farrell stated in a Jimmy Kimmel interview that he was upgraded to a black card with the serial number 001.

Gallery

References

External links
 

Fast-food chains of Ireland
Restaurants in the Republic of Ireland